Uxmal (Yucatec Maya: Óoxmáal ) is an ancient Maya city of the classical period located in present-day Mexico. It is considered one of the most important archaeological sites of Maya culture, along with Palenque, Chichen Itza and Calakmul in Mexico, Caracol and Xunantunich in Belize, and Tikal in Guatemala. It is located in the Puuc region of the eastern Yucatán Peninsula, and is considered one of the Maya cities most representative of the region's dominant architectural style. It has been designated a UNESCO World Heritage Site in recognition of its significance.

Uxmal is located 62 km south of Mérida, capital of Yucatán state in Mexico. Its buildings are noted for their size and decoration. Ancient roads called sacbes connect the buildings, and also were built to other cities in the area such as Chichén Itzá in modern-day Mexico, Caracol and Xunantunich in modern-day Belize, and Tikal in modern-day Guatemala.

Its buildings are typical of the Puuc style, with smooth low walls that open on ornate friezes based on representations of typical Maya huts. These are represented by columns (representing the reeds used for the walls of the huts) and trapezoidal shapes (representing the thatched roofs). Entwined snakes and, in many cases two-headed snakes are used for masks of the rain god, Chaac; its big noses represent the rays of the storms. Feathered serpents with open fangs are shown leaving from the same human beings. Also seen in some cities are the influences of the Nahua peoples, who followed the cult of Quetzalcoatl and Tlaloc. These were integrated with the original elements of the Puuc tradition.

Toponymy 
The present name seems to derive from Oxmal, meaning "three times built." This seems to refer to the site's antiquity and the times it had to rebuild. The etymology is disputed; another possibility is Uchmal which means "what is to come, the future." By tradition, this was supposed to be an "invisible city," built in one night by the magic of the dwarf king.

Ancient history 

While much work has been done at the popular tourist destination of Uxmal to consolidate and restore buildings, little in the way of serious archeological excavation and research has been done. The city's dates of occupation are unknown and the estimated population (about 15,000 people) is a rough guess.  Most of the city's major construction took place while Uxmal was the capital of a Late Classic Maya state around 850-925 AD. After about 1000 AD, Toltec invaders took over, and most building ceased by 1100 AD.

Maya chronicles say that Uxmal was founded about 500 A.D. by Hun Uitzil Chac Tutul Xiu. For generations Uxmal was ruled over by the Xiu family. It was the most powerful site in western Yucatán, and for a while, in alliance with Chichen Itza, dominated all of the northern Maya area. Sometime after about 1200, no new major construction seems to have been made at Uxmal, possibly related to the fall of Uxmal's ally Chichen Itza and the shift of power in Yucatán to Mayapan. The Xiu moved their capital to Maní, and the population of Uxmal declined.

Uxmal was dominant from 875 to 900 CE. The site appears to have been the capital of a regional state in the Puuc region from 850-950 CE. The Maya dynasty expanded their dominion over their neighbors. This prominence did not last long, as the population dispersed around 1000 CE.

After the Spanish conquest of Yucatán (in which the Xiu allied with the Spanish), early colonial documents suggest that Uxmal was still an inhabited place of some importance into the 1550s. As the Spanish did not build a town here, Uxmal was soon after largely abandoned.

The Maya legend The Dwarf-Wizard of Uxmal is set in Uxmal.

Description of the site 

Even before the restoration work, Uxmal was in better condition than many other Maya sites.  Much was built with well-cut stones set into a core of concrete not relying on plaster to hold the building together. The Maya architecture here is considered matched only by that of Palenque in elegance and beauty. The Puuc style of Maya architecture predominates. Thanks to its good state of preservation, it is one of the few Maya cities where the casual visitor can get a good idea of how the entire ceremonial center looked in ancient times.

Some of the more noteworthy buildings include:
 The Governor's Palace, a long low building atop a huge platform, with the longest façades in Pre-Columbian Mesoamerica.
With an approximate azimuth of 118°, the building is oriented to the main pyramid of Cehtzuc, a small site located nearly 5 km to the southeast. Observing from there, Venus as evening star, when reaching its maximum northerly extremes, would have set behind the northern edge of the Governor's Palace. Since these events occur every eight years, always in late April or early May, heralding the onset of the rainy season, it is significant that the decoration of the building's facade contains almost 400 Venus glyphs placed in the masks of the rain god Chac, and that there are eight bicephalic serpents above the main entrance; additionally, numerals 8 in bar-and-dot notation appear on two Chac masks at the northern corners of the palace.

 The Adivino (a.k.a. the Pyramid of the Magician or the Pyramid of the Dwarf), is a stepped pyramid structure, unusual among Maya structures in that its layers' outlines are oval or elliptical in shape, instead of the more common rectilinear plan.  It was a common practice in Mesoamerica to build new temple pyramids atop older ones, but here a newer pyramid was built centered slightly to the east of the older pyramid, so that on the west side the temple atop the old pyramid is preserved, with the newer temple above it.

The structure is featured in one of the best-known tales of Yucatec Maya folklore, "el enano del Uxmal" (the dwarf of Uxmal), which is also the basis for the structure's common name. Multiple versions of this tale are recorded. It was popularised after one of these was recounted by John Lloyd Stephens in his influential 1841 book, Incidents of Travel in Central America, Chiapas, and Yucatan. According to Stephens' version, the pyramid was magically built overnight during a series of challenges issued to a dwarf by the gobernador (ruler or king) of Uxmal. The dwarf's mother (a bruja, or witch) arranged the trial of strength and magic to compete against the king.
 The Nunnery Quadrangle was built from 900-1000, and the name related with nuns was assigned in the 16th century because it resembled a convent. The quadrangle consists of four palaces placed on different levels that surround a courtyard.  Of the different buildings that make up this palatial complex, several vault tops have been recovered, they are painted and represent partial calendrical dates from 906 to 907 AD, which is consistent with the Chan Chahk’ahk Nalajaw period of government.  The formal entrance, the hierarchy of the structures through the different elevations, and the absence of domestic elements suggest that this space corresponds to a royal palace with administrative and non-residential functions, where the ruling group must have had meetings to collect the tribute, make decisions, and dictate sentences among other activities.  These set of buildings are the finest of Uxmal's several fine quadrangles of long buildings. It has elaborately carved façades on both the inside and outside faces.
 A large Ballcourt for playing the Mesoamerican ballgame. Its inscription says that it was dedicated in 901 by the ruler Chan Chak K'ak'nal Ajaw, also known as Lord Chac (before the decipherment of his corresponding name glyphs). The ball court's condition is very deteriorated, and it’s made of two constructions of medium dimensions that make up the sides of the court with the rings by which the ball was to be introduced. The originally carved stone rings were removed to protect them from the elements and were replaced by reproductions.  This game has always been related to mythical and cosmic aspects. The ball symbolized the movements of the stars in the sky and the players, in repeated occasions, symbolically staged the fight of the day against the night or the struggle of the deities of the underworld against the gods of heaven.

A number of other temple-pyramids, quadrangles, and other monuments, some of significant size, and in varying states of preservation, are also at Uxmal. These include North Long Building, House of the Birds, House of the Turtles, Grand Pyramid, House of the Doves, and South Temple.

The majority of hieroglyphic inscriptions were on a series of stone stelae unusually grouped together on a single platform. The stelae depict the ancient rulers of the city. They show signs that they were deliberately broken and toppled in antiquity; some were re-erected and repaired. A further suggestion of possible war or battle is found in the remains of a wall which encircled most of the central ceremonial center.

A large raised stone pedestrian causeway links Uxmal with the site of Kabah, some 18 km to the south-east.  Archaeological research at the small island site of Uaymil, located to the west on the Gulf coast, suggests that it may have served as a port for Uxmal and provided the site access to the circum-peninsular trade network.

Modern history of the ruins 

The site, located not far from Mérida beside a road to Campeche, has attracted many visitors since the time of Mexico's independence.  The first detailed account of the ruins was published by Jean Frederic Waldeck in 1838. John Lloyd Stephens and Frederick Catherwood made two extended visits to Uxmal in the early 1840s, with architect/draftsman Catherwood reportedly making so many plans and drawings that they could be used to construct a duplicate of the ancient city (unfortunately most of the drawings are lost).) Désiré Charnay took a series of photographs of Uxmal in 1860. Some three years later Empress Carlota of Mexico visited Uxmal; in preparation for her visit local authorities had some statues and architectural elements depicting phallic themes removed from the ancient façades.

Sylvanus G. Morley made a map of the site in 1909 which included some previously overlooked buildings. The Mexican government's first project to protect some of the structures from risk of collapse or further decay came in 1927.  In 1930 Frans Blom led a Tulane University expedition to the site. They made plaster casts of the façades of the "Nunnery Quadrangle"; using these casts, a replica of the Quadrangle was constructed and displayed at the 1933 World's Fair in Chicago, Illinois. The plaster replicas of the architecture were destroyed following the fair, but some of the plaster casts of Uxmal's monuments are still kept at Tulane's Middle American Research Institute.  In 1936 a Mexican government repair and consolidation program was begun under José Erosa Peniche.

Queen Elizabeth II of the United Kingdom visited on 27 February 1975 for the inauguration of the site's sound & light show. When the presentation reached the point where the sound system played the Maya prayer to Chaac (the Maya rain deity), a sudden torrential downpour occurred. Gathered dignitaries included Gaspar Antonio Xiu, a descendant of the Xiu noble Maya lineage.

Three hotels and a small museum have been built within walking distance of the ancient city.

Microbial degradation 

Microbial biofilms have been found degrading stone buildings at Uxmal and Kabah. Phototrophs such as Xenococcus are found more often on interior walls. Stone degrading Gloeocapsa and Synechocystis were also present in large numbers.
Aureobasidium and Fusarium fungi species are present at Chichen Itza and Uxmal. Cyanobacteria were prevalent in the interiors of rooms with low light levels.

See also
List of archaeoastronomical sites sorted by country
List of Mesoamerican pyramids

Literature

References

External links

 Architecture, Restoration, and Imaging of the Maya Cities of Uxmal, Kabah, Sayil, and Labna, documentation project by Prof. Charles S. Rhyne, Reed College

 
Maya sites in Yucatán
National Monuments of Mexico
Former populated places in Mexico
Populated places established in the 6th century
6th-century establishments in the Maya civilization
Tourist attractions in Yucatán
World Heritage Sites in Mexico
Maya sites that survived the end of the Classic Period